The Limpopo Baobabs are a South African netball team that competes in the  Brutal Fruit Netball Cup. The Baobabs represent the province of Limpopo.

2017 Team
Grace Lechaba
Rumandi Potgieter 
Kamegelo Motsamai
Bianca Van der Bergh
Kgothatso Mofomme
Jackina Sithole 
Dakalo Tshikala 
Sylvia Lebelo 
Melandie Snyman 
Dineo Ledwaba 
Emily Mathosa 
Lentsa Motau 
Modjadji Ramorwala 
Ntabiseng Mothutsi 
Rasematla Motadi

References

Netball teams in South Africa
Baobabs
2013 establishments in South Africa
Sports clubs established in 2013